Chaos Is Me is the debut studio album by American screamo band Orchid. It was released on June 21, 1999, through Ebullition Records. Chaos Is Me heralded the change of the guard for extreme music, and brought both Amherst, Massachusetts and Hampshire College to the forefront of the scene's attention. The album was released on black, clear yellow, green, and red vinyl in 1999, and was also included on a 2002 compilation CD that included its follow-up Dance Tonight! Revolution Tomorrow!. It has since been reissued multiple times, on magenta vinyl in 2013, lavender vinyl in 2015, yellow vinyl in 2018, and received a 20th anniversary reissue in 2019.

Track listing

Personnel 
Orchid
 Jayson Green – vocals, lyrics
 Will Killingsworth – guitar
 Brad Wallace – bass
 Jeff Salane – drums

Production
 Kurt Ballou - production, recording

References

External links 
 

1999 albums
Ebullition Records albums
Albums produced by Kurt Ballou
Orchid (screamo band) albums
Hardcore punk albums by American artists